Li Dahui was a Chinese footballer. He competed in the men's tournament at the 1948 Summer Olympics.

References

External links
 
 

Year of birth missing
Year of death missing
Chinese footballers
China international footballers
Olympic footballers of China
Footballers at the 1948 Summer Olympics
Place of birth missing
Association football forwards
South China AA players